Csaba Szentpétery (born 28 July 1968) is a Hungarian ice dancer. He competed in the ice dance event at the 1992 Winter Olympics.

References

1968 births
Living people
Hungarian male ice dancers
Olympic figure skaters of Hungary
Figure skaters at the 1992 Winter Olympics
Figure skaters from Budapest